A salute is a gesture or other action used to indicate respect.

Salute may also refer to:

Military 
 21-gun salute, a military honour

Society and politics 
 Bellamy salute, a salute formerly used to accompany the United States Pledge of Allegiance
 Fair Antigua, We Salute Thee, the national anthem of Antigua and Barbuda
 Imperial Salute, the national anthem of Iran under the Shah
 Roman salute
 Vice Regal Salute, a piece of music played before Commonwealth governors

Entertainment 
 Ten-bell salute, used in professional wrestling to honor a wrestler who has died
 Vulcan salute, used in the Star Trek series
 Salute (1929 film), a film featuring John Wayne
 Salute (2008 film), a documentary by Matt Norman
 Satyam (2008 film) or Salute, a Telugu-language film
 Salute (2009 film), an Indian Kannada-language film
 Salute (2016 film), a biographical film on Aitzaz Hasan
 Salute (2022 Indian film), an action thriller film
 Salute (2022 Taiwanese film), a film about dancer Sheu Fang-yi

Music

Albums
 Salute (Little Mix album), 2013, or its title track (see below)
 Salute (Gordon Lightfoot album), 1983
 Salute (21 Guns album), 1992
 Salute, a non-profit album by Leslie Cheung

Songs
 "Salute", a 2014 song by British girl group Little Mix
 "Salute", a 1983 song by Gordon Lightfoot from Salute
 "Salute", a song by Fabolous from Loso's Way
 "Salute", a song by Future from Purple Reign

Other 
 Salute (pyrotechnics), a device designed to make a loud bang
 Basilica di Santa Maria della Salute, a church in Venice
 Nazi salute
 One-finger salute, another term for the finger
 Three-finger salute (disambiguation)
 Two-finger salute
 Quenelle (gesture)